Punt Muragl railway station is a railway station in the municipality of Samedan, in the Swiss canton of Graubünden. It is located on the Samedan–Pontresina line of the Rhaetian Railway.

The station has a single through track and a single platform with a waiting shelter. An adjacent industrial premise has a private siding.

A short distance from the station is the valley station of the Muottas-Muragl-Bahn, a funicular railway that ascends to the summit of Muottas Muragl. Punt Muragl Staz railway station, on the Bernina line of the Rhaetian Railway, is located on the other side of the river Flaz and accessible by a bridge.

Services
The following services stop at Punt Muragl:

References

External links
 
 

Railway stations in Graubünden
Rhaetian Railway stations
Railway stations in Switzerland opened in 1908